Awadagin Pratt (born March 6, 1966) is an American concert pianist born in Pittsburgh, Pennsylvania.

Life 

Awadagin Pratt began piano lessons at six with Leslie Sompong and violin lessons at age nine, having moved to Normal, Illinois.  With a violin scholarship he enrolled in University of Illinois at Urbana-Champaign; he then transferred to the Peabody Conservatory of Music in Baltimore as a pianist and as a violinist.

In 1992 Pratt became the first African-American pianist to win the Naumburg International Piano Competition  since then, "he has performed with nearly every major orchestra in this country [the United States], at the Clinton White House, Obama White House and on Sesame Street" (Cruice 2000). Winning the Naumburg prize launched Pratt into a strenuous performance schedule, with 40 to 50 concerts that year and 70 the following year, when he signed with the New York City artist management firm IMG Artists. In 1994 Pratt made his debut at Lincoln Center with the New York Philharmonic (Shepard 1998).

In fall 2004 Pratt accepted a position as Assistant Professor of Piano and Artist in Residence at the University of Cincinnati College-Conservatory of Music, rising to the rank of Professor of Piano. His recital debut there came on December 1, 2005 (Gelfand 2005). Pratt will join the San Francisco Conservatory of Music in July 2023 and will accept students into his studio starting next fall. Pratt continues to give up to 30 performances a year throughout the United States and abroad, and he hopes to add performances on the violin, both solo and in chamber music, to his recital calendar. A recital on March 3, 2020, drew praises for its "old-master richness." Pratt is also an experienced conductor, having led orchestras in the US and Japan.

In private life, Pratt resides in Cincinnati, Ohio with his wife Jill Meyer Pratt and their son. He continues to play tennis, and also pursues interests in chess and fine wines.

Performance preferences 

Writers often note Pratt's appearance.  "Pratt takes the stage at Boston's Jordan Hall in a subtle but colorful green-and-lavender striped and checked shirt. His black pants reveal a dash of whimsicality below the cuffs: socks adorned with a portrait of Van Gogh" (Shepard 1998).  Among other composers whose works he has espoused are Johann Sebastian Bach, Ludwig van Beethoven, Johannes Brahms, César Franck, Edvard Grieg, Modest Mussorgsky, and Sergei Rachmaninoff.

Recordings 
Pratt has released several recordings on compact disc:
A Long Way From Normal (EMI, 1994), Pratt's debut album, including music of Liszt, Franck, Brahms, and Bach.  The title is a reference to his boyhood home of Normal, Illinois.
Beethoven Piano Sonatas (EMI, 1995), including sonatas 7, 9, 30, and 31.
Live From South Africa (EMI, 1997), which was recorded in Cape Town (Shepard 1998), including works of Bach, Brahms, Franck, and Rachmaninoff.
Transformations (EMI 72435 56836, November 16, 1999),  including Mussorgsky's Pictures at an Exhibition; Pratt's own transcription of Bach's Passacaglia and Fugue in C minor, BWV 582; and Brahms's Variations and Fugue on a Theme by Handel, all played on a Bösendorfer Imperial Grand.
Play Bach (Angel 2002), including Bach's Brandenburg Concerto no. 5 in D Major, BWV 1050; Keyboard Concerti nos. 4 in A Major, BWV 1055, and 5 in F Minor, BWV 1056; and shorter works, all with a chamber ensemble performing one to a part.

References 

(2000-04-09) Cruice, Valerie; Music; A pianist with plans for time traveling; New York Times.  
Gelfand, Janelle. 2005. A minute with... Awadagin Pratt, The Enquirer, Dec. 2005. 
 (2005) Classical superstar joins CCM faculty at the University of Cincinnati'; University of Cincinnati Magazine (magazine.uc.edu). 
(2003) Serinus, Jason V.; Interview with Pianist Awadagin Pratt; (hometheaterhifi.com).
Artist Profile at Saint Paul Sunday (Saint Paul, Minnesota); (publicradio.org). 
(1998) Shepard, T. Brooks; Classical romance from Awadagin Pratt - African American pianist excels at classical European music; (findarticles.com).
Biography at Bach-cantatas.com 
(2001-11-14); CFA Welcomes Acclaimed Pianist Awadagin Pratt; The Mason Gazette (gazette.gmu.edu). 
(1995-02-16); Barron, James;  ON TOUR WITH: Awadagin Pratt; Knowing What It Means to Solo; The New York Times (nytimes.com). 
(2007-09-24); Gladstone, Valerie; Pratt's Triple Threat; The New York Sun (nysun.com). 
(2008-11-15); One Voice Chorus  presents Bringing Out the Best:  Beethoven, Brahms & Burleigh with special guest, world-class pianist Awadagin Pratt.

External links
Official site
Pratt Music Foundation
 
 Awadagin Pratt Collection, McLean County Museum of History

1966 births
American classical pianists
Male classical pianists
American male pianists
Living people
Peabody Institute alumni
African-American classical pianists
EMI Classics and Virgin Classics artists
People from Normal, Illinois
Articles containing video clips
20th-century American pianists
Classical musicians from Illinois
21st-century classical pianists
20th-century American male musicians
21st-century American male musicians
21st-century American pianists
Women classical pianists
20th-century African-American musicians
21st-century African-American musicians